Eclipsiodes is a genus of moths of the family Crambidae.

Species
Eclipsiodes anthomera (Lower, 1896)
Eclipsiodes crypsixantha Meyrick, 1884
Eclipsiodes homora Turner, 1908

Former species
Eclipsiodes orthogramma (Lower, 1902)
Eclipsiodes schizodesma (Lower, 1899)
Eclipsiodes semigilva Turner, 1922

References

Heliothelini
Taxa named by Edward Meyrick
Crambidae genera